Hong Sung-ho (born 20 December 1954) is a South Korean football defender who played for South Korea in the 1980 Asian Cup. He also played for Hallelujah FC, Korean Loyalty and POSCO F.C.

International Record

References

External links

1954 births
Living people
South Korean footballers
Association football defenders
South Korea international footballers
1980 AFC Asian Cup players
Pohang Steelers players